Peddinti Madhu Priya is an Indian Telugu playback singer. She became popular on Telugu television with her folk song Adapillanamma Nenu Adapilanani. She was one of the participants of the Telugu reality TV show Bigg Boss Telugu (season 1) and she was evicted on Day 13.

Career
Madhu Priya made her Tollywood debut with her singing for the film Daggaraga Dooranga. For the song "Vachinde" from the movie Fidaa, she won the Filmfare Award for Best Play Back Singer Female. She participated in the Star Maa reality series Bigg Boss Telugu and was evicted on Day 13.

Discography

Television

References

Living people
1997 births
Telugu playback singers
People from Karimnagar district
Bigg Boss (Telugu TV series) contestants
Indian women playback singers
South Indian International Movie Awards winners
Filmfare Awards South winners
Women musicians from Telangana
21st-century Indian women singers
21st-century Indian singers
Indian women folk singers